Sri Mullapudi Venkataraya Memorial Polytechnic (SMVM Polytechnic) is a polytechnic college offering diploma courses. Situated at Tanuku, West Godavari District, Andhra Pradesh, it was established in 1958. It is one of the oldest polytechnic institutes in India. Recently, the  government of Andhra Pradesh granted SDC (SKILL DEVELOPMENT CENTRE) having many training programmes like progecad and it is also holding the development of Rajiv Yuva Kiranalu programme.

Campus details 
SMVM Polytechnic offers five diploma courses in electronics and communication (DECE), Civil (DCE), Mechanical (DME), Electrical & electronic Engineering (DEEE) & Applied Electronics and instrumentation engineering (DAEI)

Education 
SMVM Polytechnic is under State Board of Technical Education & Training, Andhra Pradesh and All India Council for Technical Education approved. This institute offers diploma in four branches. Semester examination held in January and June every year.

External links 
 Alumni Site
 Alumni google Group
 Whatsapp Group
 Facebook Page
 Telegram Group
 Campus Wikimapia Link

Engineering colleges in Andhra Pradesh
Universities and colleges in West Godavari district
Educational institutions established in 1958
1958 establishments in Andhra Pradesh